Ralph McMaster Rich (22 January 1916 - 18 June 1942) was an aviator of the United States Navy during World War II.

Ralph McMaster Rich, born on 22 January 1916 in Denmark, North Dakota, enlisted in the U.S. Naval Reserve on 12 October 1939 in Minneapolis, Minnesota.  After receiving initial flight training in Minnesota, Aviation Cadet Rich reported for active duty at Pensacola, Florida, on 28 December 1939.  Designated a Naval Aviator on 12 July 1940, he was commissioned as an Ensign on 16 August, and assigned to Fighting Squadron Six (VF-6) embarked aboard the aircraft carrier Enterprise (CV-6) on 28 November.

ENS Rich participated in several of the early actions of the Pacific War.  Among them were the 1 February 1942 raid on the Marshall Islands, in which he destroyed a Japanese bomber on the ground, and the 24 February attack on Wake Island.

Promoted to Lieutenant (junior grade) on 28 May 1942, he led a section of fighters covering the approach of American bombers against the Japanese fleet during the Battle of Midway 4 to 6 June 1942.
On 18 June 1942, while participating in aerial gunnery practice over the Hawaiian Islands, his F4F-4 "Wildcat" crashed, killing him instantly. During a routine gunnery dive over NAS Kaneohe Bay, a wing tore off of Wildcat, BuNo 5184, of VF-3, at 5,000 feet. He was awarded the Navy Cross posthumously for his "capable and aggressive leadership" in the Midway battle, which enabled his attack group to "maintain continuous flight over enemy naval units, thereby assuring our dive bombers an unmolested approach."

Namesakes
Two Navy ships have been named USS Rich in his honor.

References

External links
 DANFS biography of LTJG Ralph Rich
 NHS biography of LTJG Ralph Rich

1916 births
1942 deaths
United States Naval Aviators
Recipients of the Navy Cross (United States)
United States Navy officers
United States Navy personnel killed in World War II